The 1898 DePauw football team was an American football team that represented DePauw University in the 1898 college football season. The team compiled a 3–4–2 record, and shut out three opponents.  However, they were outscored 97 to 91, and suffered four shutouts against them by college opponents.

Schedule

References

DePauw
DePauw Tigers football seasons
DePauw football